McKnight is an unincorporated community in Allegheny County, Pennsylvania, United States. The area known as McKnight is located in the municipality of Ross Township, in suburban Pittsburgh, and in the North Hills School District.

McKnight's zip code is 15237.

References 

Unincorporated communities in Allegheny County, Pennsylvania
Unincorporated communities in Pennsylvania